The presidency of Ulysses S. Grant began on March 4, 1869, when Ulysses S. Grant was inaugurated as the 18th president of the United States, and ended on March 4, 1877. The Reconstruction era took place during Grant's two terms of office. The Ku Klux Klan caused widespread violence throughout the South against African Americans. By 1870, all former Confederate states had been readmitted into the United States and were represented in Congress. However, Democrats and former slave owners refused to accept that freedmen were citizens who were granted suffrage by the Fifteenth Amendment, which prompted Congress to pass three Force Acts to allow the federal government to intervene when states failed to protect former slaves' rights. Following an escalation of Klan violence in the late 1860s, Grant and his attorney general, Amos T. Akerman, head of the newly created Department of Justice, began a crackdown on Klan activity in the South, starting in South Carolina, where Grant sent federal troops to capture Klan members. This led the Klan to demobilize and helped ensure fair elections in 1872.

Rather than develop a cadre of trustworthy political advisers, Grant was self-reliant in choosing his cabinet. He relied heavily on former Army associates, who had a thin understanding of politics and a weak sense of civilian ethics. Numerous scandals plagued his administration, including allegations of bribery, fraud, and cronyism. Grant did respond to corruption charges. At times, he appointed reformers, such as for the prosecution of the Whiskey Ring. Additionally, Grant advanced the cause of Civil Service Reform, more than any president before him, creating America's first Civil Service Commission. In 1872, Grant signed into law an Act of Congress that established Yellowstone National Park, the nation's first National Park.

The United States was at peace with the world throughout Grant's eight years in office, but his handling of foreign policy was uneven. Tensions with Native American tribes in the West continued. Under Secretary of State Hamilton Fish, the Treaty of Washington restored relations with Britain and resolved the contentious Alabama Claims, while the Virginius Affair with Spain was settled peacefully. Grant attempted to annex the Caribbean island of Santo Domingo, but the annexation was blocked by the Senate. Grant's presidential reputation has improved during the 21st Century due to Grant's enforcement of civil rights for blacks.

Background

Ulysses S. Grant was a native of Ohio, born in 1822. After graduating from West Point in 1843 he served in the Mexican–American War. In 1848, Grant married Julia, and had four children. He resigned from the Army in 1854. Upon the start of the American Civil War, Grant returned to the Army in 1861. A successful general, Grant rose in rank in the Army. Grant had decisive victories at Vicksburg and Chattanooga and was promoted to Commanding General of Union Army by Abraham Lincoln. Grant eventually defeated Robert E. Lee, after hard-fought conflicts at the Wilderness and Petersburg. Lee surrendered to Grant at Appomatox, and the war ended in 1865. After the war, Grant served under Andrew Johnson, and was in charge of enforcing Reconstruction, in addition to being in charge of Indian conflicts among settlers. Grant and Johnson became at odds with each other when Grant defended Congressional Reconstruction, which abolished slavery and gave blacks citizenship, compared to Johnson's Reconstruction, which bypassed Congress and was lenient to white southerners.

Election of 1868

Grant's rise in political popularity among Republicans was based on his successful generalship that defeated Robert E. Lee, and his dramatic break from President Andrew Johnson. His presidential nomination was unopposed and inevitable. The Republican Party delegates unanimously named Grant the presidential candidate at its May convention held in Chicago. House Speaker Schuyler Colfax, was chosen its vice-presidential candidate.

The 1868 Republican Party platform advocated the enfranchisement of African Americans in the South but kept the issue open in the North. It opposed using greenbacks, only gold, to redeem U.S. bonds, encouraged immigration, endorsed full rights for naturalized citizens, and favored radical reconstruction as distinct from the more lenient policy espoused by President Andrew Johnson. In Grant's acceptance letter he said: "Let us have peace." These words became the Republican popular mantra.

Grant won the presidential election with an overwhelming Electoral College victory, receiving 214 votes to Seymour's 80. Grant also received 52.7 percent of the popular vote nationwide. Grant's margin of victory was enhanced by six southern states controlled by Republicans, while many ex-Confederates were still prevented from voting.

First term 1869–1873

Inaugural Address (1869)

Grant's March 4, 1869, Inaugural speech addressed four priorities. First, Grant said he would approach Reconstruction "calmly, without prejudice, hate, or sectional pride; remembering that the greatest good for the greatest number is the object to be obtained." Second, Grant spoke on the nation's financial situation, advocating "a return to a specie basis." Third, Grant spoke on foreign policy, advocating Americans be respected with equality around the world. Fourth, Grant advocated the passage of the 15th Amendment, that blacks, or former slaves, receive the constitutional right to vote.

Cabinet
Grant's cabinet choices surprised the nation by Grant's independence from getting the traditional consultation from prominent Republicans. His cabinet was met with both criticism and approval. Grant appointed Elihu B. Washburne Secretary of State, as a friendship courtesy, only to briefly serve office, and then be appointed Minister to France. Grant then appointed conservative Hamilton Fish, former governor of New York, to succeed Washburne.  Grant appointed wealthy New York merchant Alexander T. Stewart Secretary of Treasury, but he was quickly found to be disqualified by a federal law that prohibited anyone in the office to engage in commerce. When Congress would not amend the law, at Grant's bidding, an embarrassed Grant appointed Massachusetts Congressman George S. Boutwell, to replace Stewart. For Secretary of War, Grant appointed his former Army chief of staff John A. Rawlins, however, Rawlins died of tuberculosis in September 1869. To replace Rawlins, six weeks later, Grant appointed former Union Army General William W. Belknap.

For U.S. Attorney General, Grant appointed Massachusetts Supreme Judicial associate justice Ebenezer Rockwood Hoar. For Secretary of Navy, Grant appointed Philadelphia businessman Adolph E. Borie. Finding the job stressful, Borie resigned from office on June 25, 1869. Borie's noted accomplishment was the racial integration of the Washington Navy Yard. To replace Borie, Grant appointed a former New Jersey public prosecutor George M. Robeson. For Secretary of Interior, Grant appointed former Ohio governor and senator Jacob D. Cox. For Postmaster General, Grant appointed U.S. Senator of Maryland, John A.J. Creswell, who racially integrated the U.S. Postal Service.

Tenure of Office Act modified
In March 1869, President Grant made it known he desired the Tenure of Office Act (1867) repealed, stating it was a "stride toward a revolution in our free system". Grant believed the Tenure Act was a major curtailment to presidential power. To bolster the repeal effort, Grant declined to make any new appointments except for vacancies, until the law was overturned. On March 9, 1869, the House repealed the law outright, but the Senate Judiciary Committee rejected the bill and only offered Grant a temporary suspension of the law. When Grant objected, the Senate Republican caucus met, and proposed allowing the President to have a free hand in choosing and removing his own cabinet. The Senate Judiciary Committee wrote the new bill. A muddled compromise was reached by the House and Senate. Grant signed the bill into law on April 5, having gotten virtually everything he wanted.

Reconstruction

Fifteenth Amendment

Grant worked to ensure ratification of the Fifteenth Amendment approved by Congress and sent to the states during the last days of the Johnson administration. The amendment prohibited the federal and state governments from denying a citizen the right to vote based on that citizen's "race, color, or previous condition of servitude." On December 24, 1869, Grant established federal military rule in Georgia and restored black legislators who had been expelled from the state legislature. On February 3, 1870, the amendment reached the requisite number of state ratifications (then 27) and was certified as the Fifteenth Amendment to the United States Constitution. Grant hailed its ratification as "a measure of grander importance than any other one act of the kind from the foundation of our free government to the present day". By mid-1870 former Confederate states: Virginia, Texas, Mississippi, and Georgia had ratified the 15th Amendment and were readmitted to the Union.

Department of Justice

On June 22, 1870, Grant signed a bill into law passed by Congress that created the Department of Justice and to aid the Attorney General, the Office of Solicitor General. Grant appointed Amos T. Akerman as Attorney General and Benjamin H. Bristow as America's first Solicitor General. Both Akerman and Bristow used the Department of Justice to vigorously prosecute Ku Klux Klan members in the early 1870s. Grant appointed Hiram C. Whitley as director of the new Secret Service Agency in 1869, after he had successfully arrested 12 Klansmen in Georgia who would murdered a leading local Republican official. Whitley used talented detectives who infiltrated and broke up KKK units in North Carolina and Alabama. However, they could not penetrate the main hotbed of KKK activity in upstate South Carolina. Grant sent in Army troops but Whitley's agents learned they were lying below until the troops were withdrawn. Whitley warned Akerman, who convinced Grant to declare martial law and send in US marshals backed by federal troops to arrest 500 Klansmen; hundred more fled the state, and hundreds of others surrendered in return for leniency.

In the first few years of Grant's first term in office, there were 1000 indictments against Klan members with over 550 convictions from the Department of Justice. By 1871, there were 3000 indictments and 600 convictions with most only serving brief sentences while the ringleaders were imprisoned for up to five years in the federal penitentiary in Albany, New York. The result was a dramatic decrease in violence in the South. Akerman gave credit to Grant and told a friend that no one was "better" or "stronger" than Grant when it came to prosecuting terrorists. Akerman's successor, George H. Williams, in December 1871, continued to prosecute the Klan throughout 1872 until the Spring of 1873 during Grant's second term in office. Williams' clemency and moratorium on Klan prosecutions was due in part to the fact that the Justice Department, having been inundated by Klan outrage cases, did not have the effective manpower to continue the prosecutions.

Naturalization Act of 1870
On July 14, 1870, Grant signed into law the Naturalization Act of 1870 that allowed persons of African descent to become citizens of the United States. This revised an earlier law, the Naturalization Act of 1790 that only allowed white persons of good moral character to become U.S. citizens. The law also prosecuted persons who used fictitious names, misrepresentations, or identities of deceased individuals when applying for citizenship.

Force Acts of 1870 and 1871

To add enforcement to the 15th Amendment, Congress passed an act that guaranteed the protection of voting rights of African Americans; Grant signed the bill, known as the Force Act of 1870 into law on May 31, 1870. This law was designed to keep the Redeemers from attacking or threatening African Americans. This act placed severe penalties on persons who used intimidation, bribery, or physical assault to prevent citizens from voting and placed elections under Federal jurisdiction.

On January 13, 1871, Grant submitted to Congress a report on violent acts committed by the Ku Klux Klan in the South. On March 23, Grant told a reluctant Congress the situation in the South was dire and federal legislation was needed that would "secure life, liberty, and property, and the enforcement of law, in all parts of the United States." Grant stated that the U.S. mail and the collection of revenue was in jeopardy. Congress investigated the Klan's activities and eventually passed the Force Act of 1871 to allow prosecution of the Klan. This Act, also known as the "Ku Klux Klan Act" and written by Representative Benjamin Butler, was passed by Congress to specifically go after local units of the Ku Klux Klan. Although sensitive to charges of establishing a military dictatorship, Grant signed the bill into law on April 20, 1871, after being convinced by Secretary of Treasury, George Boutwell, that federal protection was warranted, having cited documented atrocities against the Freedmen. This law allowed the president to suspend habeas corpus on "armed combinations" and conspiracies by the Klan. The Act also empowered the president "to arrest and break up disguised night marauders". The actions of the Klan were defined as high crimes and acts of rebellion against the United States.

The Ku Klux Klan consisted of local secret organizations formed to violently oppose Republican rule during Reconstruction; there was no organization above the local level. Wearing white hoods to hide their identity the Klan would attack and threaten Republicans. The Klan was strong in South Carolina between 1868 and 1870; South Carolina Governor Robert K. Scott, who was mired in corruption charges, allowed the Klan to rise to power. Grant, who was fed up with their violent tactics, ordered the Ku Klux Klan to disperse from South Carolina and lay down their arms under the authority of the Enforcement Acts on October 12, 1871. There was no response, and so on October 17, 1871, Grant issued a suspension of habeas corpus in all the 9 counties in South Carolina. Grant ordered federal troops in the state who then captured the Klan; who were vigorously prosecuted by Att. Gen. Akerman and Sol. Gen. Bristow. With the Klan destroyed other white supremacist groups would emerge, including the White League and the Red Shirts.

Amnesty Act of 1872

Texas was readmitted into the Union on March 30, 1870, Mississippi was readmitted February 23, 1870, and Virginia on January 26, 1870. Georgia became the last Confederate state to be readmitted into the Union on July 15, 1870. All members of the House of Representatives and Senate were seated from the 10 Confederate states who seceded. Technically, the United States was again a united country.

To ease tensions, Grant signed the Amnesty Act of 1872 on May 23, 1872, which gave amnesty to former Confederates. This act allowed most former Confederates, who before the war had taken an oath to uphold the Constitution of the United States, to hold elected public office. Only 500 former Confederates remained unpardonable and therefore forbidden to hold elected public office.

Financial affairs

Public Credit Act
On taking office Grant's first move was signing the Act to Strengthen the Public Credit, which the Republican Congress had just passed. It ensured that all public debts, particularly war bonds, would be paid only in gold rather than in greenbacks. The price of gold on the New York exchange fell to $130 per ounce – the lowest point since the suspension of specie payment in 1862.

Federal wages raised
On May 19, 1869, Grant protected the wages of those working for the U.S. Government. In 1868, a law was passed that reduced the government working day to 8 hours; however, much of the law was later repealed that allowed day wages to also be reduced. To protect workers Grant signed an executive order that "no reduction shall be made in the wages" regardless of the reduction in hours for the government day workers.

Boutwell reforms
Treasury Secretary George S. Boutwell reorganized and reformed the United States Treasury by discharging unnecessary employees, started sweeping changes in Bureau of Printing and Engraving to protect the currency from counterfeiters, and revitalized tax collections to hasten the collection of revenue. These changes soon led the Treasury to have a monthly surplus. By May 1869, Boutwell reduced the national debt by $12 million. By September the national debt was reduced by $50 million, which was achieved by selling the growing gold surplus at weekly auctions for greenbacks and buying back wartime bonds with the currency. The New York Tribune wanted the government to buy more bonds and greenbacks and the New York Times praised the Grant administration's debt policy.

The first two years of the Grant administration with George Boutwell at the Treasury helm expenditures had been reduced to $292 million in 1871 – down from $322 million in 1869. The cost of collecting taxes fell to 3.11% in 1871. Grant reduced the number of employees working in the government by 2,248 persons from 6,052 on March 1, 1869, to 3,804 on December 1, 1871. He had increased tax revenues by $108 million from 1869 to 1872. During his first administration the national debt fell from $2.5 billion to $2.2 billion.

In a rare case of preemptive reform during the Grant Administration, Brevet Major General Alfred Pleasonton was dismissed for being unqualified to hold the position of Commissioner of Internal Revenue. In 1870, Pleasonton, a Grant appointment, approved an unauthorized $60,000 tax refund and was associated with an alleged unscrupulous Connecticut firm. Treasury Secretary George Boutwell promptly stopped the refund and personally informed Grant that Pleasonton was incompetent to hold office. Refusing to resign on Boutwell's request, Pleasonton protested openly before Congress. Grant removed Pleasonton before any potential scandal broke out.

Gold corner conspiracy

In September 1869, financial manipulators Jay Gould and Jim Fisk set up an elaborate scam to corner the gold market, buying up all the gold at the same time to drive up the price. The plan was to keep the Government from selling gold, thus driving its price. Grant and Secretary of Treasury George S. Boutwell found out about the gold market speculation and ordered the sale of $4 million in gold on (Black) Friday, September 23. Gould and Fisk were thwarted, and the price of gold dropped. The effects of releasing gold by Boutwell were disastrous. Stock prices plunged and food prices dropped, devastating farmers for years.

Foreign affairs

Grant was a man of peace, and almost wholly devoted to domestic affairs. There were no foreign-policy disasters, and no wars to engage in. Besides Grant himself, the main players in foreign affairs were Secretary of State Hamilton Fish and the chairman of the Senate Foreign Relations Committee Charles Sumner. They had to cooperate to get a treaty ratified. When Sumner stopped Grant's plan to annex Santo Domingo, Grant had his vengeance by systematically destroying Sumner's power and ending his career. Historians have high regard for the diplomatic professionalism, independence, and good judgment of Hamilton Fish. The main issues involved Britain, Canada, Santo Domingo, Cuba, and Spain.  Worldwide, it was a peaceful era, with no major wars directly affecting the United States. In Europe, Otto von Bismarck was leading Prussia into a dominant position in the new united German Empire. After short, decisive wars with Denmark, Austria and France ended in 1871, Bismarck was the dominant figure in Europe and worked tirelessly and successfully to promote a peaceful continent until his removal in 1890.

The foreign policy of the Administration was generally successful, except for the attempt to annex Santo Domingo. The annexation of Santo Domingo was Grant's effort to create a haven for blacks in the South and was a first step to end slavery in Cuba and Brazil. The dangers of a confrontation with Britain on the Alabama question were resolved peacefully, and to the monetary advantage of the United States. Issues regarding the Canadian boundary were easily settled. The achievements were the work of Secretary Hamilton Fish, who was a spokesman for caution and stability. A poll of historians has stated that Secretary Fish was one of the greatest Secretaries of States in United States history. Fish served as Secretary of State for nearly the entire two terms.

Hamilton Fish (18081893) was a wealthy New Yorker of Dutch descent who served as Governor of New York (1849 to 1850), and United States Senator (1851 to 1857). Historians emphasize his judiciousness and efforts towards reform and diplomatic moderation. Fish settled the controversial Alabama Claims with Great Britain through his development of the concept of international arbitration. Fish kept the United States out of war with Spain over Cuban independence by coolly handling the volatile Virginius Incident.  In 1875, Fish initiated the process that would ultimately lead to Hawaiian statehood, by having negotiated a reciprocal trade treaty for the island nation's sugar production.  He also organized a peace conference and treaty in Washington D.C. between South American countries and Spain. Fish worked with James Milton Turner, America's first African American consul, to settle the Liberian-Grebo war. President Grant said he trusted Fish the most for political advice.

Santo Domingo (Dominican Republic)

In 1869, Grant proposed to annex the independent Spanish-speaking black nation of the Dominican Republic, then known as Santo Domingo. Previously in 1868, President Andrew Johnson had proposed annexation but Congress refused.  In July 1869 Grant sent Orville E. Babcock and Rufus Ingalls who negotiated a draft treaty with Dominican Republic president Buenaventura Báez for the annexation of Santo Domingo to the United States and the sale of Samaná Bay for $2 million. To keep the island nation and Báez secure in power, Grant ordered naval ships to secure the island from invasion and internal insurrection. Báez signed an annexation treaty on November 19, 1869. Secretary Fish drew up a final draft of the proposal and offered $1.5 million to the Dominican national debt, the annexation of Santo Domingo as an American state, the United States' acquisition of the rights for Samaná Bay for 50 years with an annual $150,000 rental, and guaranteed protection from foreign intervention. On January 10, 1870, the Santo Domingo treaty was submitted to the Senate for ratification. Despite his support of the annexation, Grant made the mistakes of not building support in Congress or the country at large.

Not only did Grant believe that the island would be of strategic value to the Navy, particularly Samaná Bay, but also he sought to use it as a bargaining chip. By providing a safe haven for the freedmen, he believed that the exodus of black labor would force Southern whites to realize the necessity of such a significant workforce and accept their civil rights. Grant believed the island country would increase exports and lower the trade deficit. He hoped that U.S. ownership of the island would push Spain to abolish slavery in Cuba and Puerto Rico, and perhaps Brazil as well. On March 15, 1870, the Foreign Relations Committee, headed by Sen. Charles Sumner, recommended against treaty passage. Sumner, the leading spokesman for African American civil rights, believed that annexation would be enormously expensive and involve the U.S. in an ongoing civil war, and would threaten the independence of Haiti and the West Indies, thereby blocking black political progress. On May 31, 1870, Grant went before Congress and urged passage of the Dominican annexation treaty. Strongly opposed to ratification, Sumner successfully led the opposition in the Senate. On June 30, 1870, the Santo Domingo annexation treaty failed to pass the Senate; 28 votes in favor of the treaty and 28 votes against. Grant's own cabinet was divided over the Santo Domingo annexation attempt, and Bancroft Davis, assistant to Sec. Hamilton Fish, was secretly giving information to Sen. Sumner on state department negotiations.

Grant was determined to keep the Dominican Republic treaty in the public debate, mentioning Dominican Republic annexation in his December 1870 State of the Union Address. Grant was able to get Congress in January 1871 to create a special Commission to investigate the island. Senator Sumner continued to vigorously oppose and speak out against annexation. Grant appointed Frederick Douglass, an African American civil rights activist, as one of the Commissioners who voyaged to the Dominican Republic. Returning to the United States after several months, the Commission in April 1871, issued a report that stated the Dominican people desired annexation and that the island would be beneficial to the United States. To celebrate the Commissions return, Grant invited the Commissioners to the White House, except Frederick Douglass. African American leaders were upset and the issue of Douglass not being invited to the White House dinner was brought up during the 1872 presidential election by Horace Greeley. Douglass, however, who was personally disappointed for not being invited to the White House, remained loyal to Grant and the Republican Party. Although the Commission supported Grant's annexation attempt, there was not enough enthusiasm in Congress to vote on a second annexation treaty.

Unable constitutionally to go directly after Sen. Sumner, Grant immediately removed Sumner's close and respected friend Ambassador, John Lothrop Motley. With Grant's prodding in the Senate, Sumner was finally deposed from the Foreign Relations Committee. Grant reshaped his coalition, known as "New Radicals", working with enemies of Sumner such as Ben Butler of Massachusetts, Roscoe Conkling of New York, and Oliver P. Morton of Indiana, giving in to Fish's demands that Cuba rebels be rejected, and moving his Southern patronage from the radical blacks and carpetbaggers who were allied with Sumner to more moderate Republicans. This set the stage of the Liberal Republican revolt of 1872, when Sumner and his allies publicly denounced Grant and supported Horace Greeley and the Liberal Republicans.

A Congressional investigation in June 1870 led by Senator Carl Schurz revealed that Babcock and Ingalls both had land interests in the Bay of Samaná that would increase in value if the Santo Domingo treaty were ratified. U.S. Navy ships, with Grant's authorization, had been sent to protect Báez from an invasion by a Dominican rebel, Gregorio Luperón, while the treaty negotiations were taking place. The investigation had initially been called to settle a dispute between an American businessman Davis Hatch against the United States government. Báez had imprisoned Hatch without trial for his opposition to the Báez government. Hatch had claimed that the United States had failed to protect him from imprisonment. The majority Congressional report dismissed Hatch's claim and exonerated both Babcock and Ingalls. The Hatch incident, however, kept certain Senators from being enthusiastic about ratifying the treaty.

Cuban insurrection

The Cuban rebellion 1868–1878 against Spanish rule, called by historians the Ten Years' War, gained wide sympathy in the U.S.  Juntas based in New York raised money, and smuggled men and munitions to Cuba, while energetically spreading propaganda in American newspapers. The Grant administration turned a blind eye to this violation of American neutrality.  In 1869, Grant was urged by popular opinion to support rebels in Cuba with military assistance and to give them U.S. diplomatic recognition. Fish, however, wanted stability and favored the Spanish government, without publicly challenging the popular anti-Spanish American viewpoint.  They reassured European governments that the U.S. did not want to annex Cuba. Grant and Fish gave lip service to Cuban independence, called for an end to slavery in Cuba, and quietly opposed American military intervention. Fish, worked diligently against popular pressure, and was able to keep Grant from officially recognizing Cuban independence because it would have endangered negotiations with Britain over the Alabama Claims. Minister to Spain Daniel Sickles failed to get Spain to agree to American mediation. Grant and Fish did not succumb to popular pressures. Grant's message to Congress urged strict neutrality not to officially recognize the Cuban revolt, which eventually petered out.

Treaty of Washington

Historians have credited the Treaty of Washington for implementing International Arbitration to allow outside experts to settle disputes. Grant's able Secretary of State Hamilton Fish had orchestrated many of the events leading up to the treaty. Previously, Secretary of State William H. Seward during the Johnson administration first proposed an initial treaty concerning damages done to American merchants by three Confederate warships, CSS Florida, CSS Alabama, and CSS Shenandoah built in Britain. These damages were collectively known as the Alabama Claims. These ships had inflicted tremendous damage to U.S. shipping, as insurance rates soared and shippers switched to British ships. Washington wanted the British to pay heavy damages, perhaps including turning over Canada.

In April 1869, the U.S. Senate overwhelmingly rejected a proposed treaty which paid too little and contained no admission of British guilt for prolonging the war. Senator Charles Sumner spoke up before Congress; publicly denounced Queen Victoria; demanded a huge reparation; and opened the possibility of Canada ceded to the United States as payment. The speech angered the British government, and talks had to be put off until matters cooled down. Negotiations for a new treaty began in January 1871 when Britain sent Sir John Rose to America to meet with Fish. A joint high commission was created on February 9, 1871, in Washington, consisting of representatives from both Britain and the United States. The commission created a treaty where an international Tribunal would settle the damage amounts; the British admitted regret, not fault, over the destructive actions of the Confederate war cruisers. Grant approved and signed the treaty on May 8, 1871; the Senate ratified the Treaty of Washington on May 24, 1871.

The Tribunal met on neutral territory in Geneva, Switzerland. The panel of five international arbitrators included Charles Francis Adams, who was counseled by William M. Evarts, Caleb Cushing, and Morrison R. Waite. On August 25, 1872, the Tribunal awarded United States $15.5 million in gold; $1.9 million was awarded to Great Britain. Historian Amos Elwood Corning noted that the Treaty of Washington and arbitration "bequeathed to the world a priceless legacy". In addition to the $15.5 million arbitration award, the treaty resolved some disputes over borders and fishing rights. On October 21, 1872, William I, Emperor of Germany, settled a boundary dispute in favor of the United States.

Korean incident 

A primary role of the United States Navy in the 19th century was to protect American commercial interests and open trade to Eastern markets, including Japan and China. Korea was a small independent country that excluded all foreign trade. Washington sought a treaty dealing with shipwrecked sailors after the crew of a stranded American commercial ship was executed. The long-term goal for the Grant Administration was to open Korea to Western markets in the same way Commodore Matthew Perry had opened Japan in 1854 by a Naval display of military force. On May 30, 1871, Rear Admiral John Rodgers with a fleet of five ships, part of the Asiatic Squadron, arrived at the mouth of the Salee River below Seoul. While waiting for senior Korean officials to negotiate, Rogers sent ships out to make soundings of the Salee River for navigational purposes.

The American fleet was fired upon by a Korean fort, but there was little damage. Rogers gave the Korean government ten days to apologize or begin talks, but the Royal Court kept silent. After ten days passed, on June 10, Rogers began a series of amphibious assaults that destroyed 5 Korean forts. These military engagements were known as the Battle of Ganghwa. Several hundred Korean soldiers and three Americans were killed. Korea still refused to negotiate, and the American fleet sailed away. The Koreans refer to this 1871 U.S. military action as Shinmiyangyo. Grant defended Rogers in his third annual message to Congress in December 1871. After a change in regimes in Seoul, in 1881, the U.S. negotiated a treaty – the first treaty between Korea and a Western nation.

Native American affairs

After the very bloody frontier wars in the 1860s, Grant sought to build a "peace policy" toward the tribes. He emphasized appointees who wanted peace, and were favorable toward religious groups. In the end, however, the western warfare grew worse.

Grant declared in his 1869 Inaugural Address that he favored "any course toward them which tends to their civilization and ultimate citizenship." In a bold step, Grant appointed his aide General Ely S. Parker, Donehogawa (a Seneca), the first Native American Commissioner of Indian Affairs. Parker met some opposition in the Senate until Attorney General Hoar said Parker was legally able to hold the office. The Senate confirmed Parker by a vote of 36 to 12. During Parker's tenure Native wars dropped from 101 in 1869 to 58 in 1870.

Board of Indian Commissioners
Early on Grant met with tribal chiefs of the Choctaw, Creek, Cherokee, and Chickasaw nations who expressed interest to teach "wild" Natives outside their own settled districts farming skills. Grant told the Native chiefs that American settlement would lead to inevitable conflict, but that the "march to civilization" would lead to pacification. On April 10, 1869, Congress created the Board of Indian Commissioners. Grant appointed volunteer members who were "eminent for their intelligence and philanthropy." The Grant Board was given extensive joint-power with Grant, Secretary of Interior Cox, and the Interior Department to supervise the Bureau of Indian Affairs and "civilize" Native Americans. No Natives were appointed to the committee, only European Americans. The commission monitored purchases and began to inspect Native agencies. It attributed much of the trouble in Native country to the encroachment of whites. The board approved of the destruction of Native culture. The Natives were to be instructed in Christianity, agriculture, representative government, and assimilated on reservations.

Marias Massacre
On January 23, 1870, the Peace Policy was tested when Major Edward M. Baker senselessly slaughtered 173 Piegan Indians, mostly women, and children, in the Marias Massacre. Public outcry increased when General Sheridan defended Baker's actions. On July 15, 1870, Grant signed Congressional legislation that barred military officers from holding either elected or appointed office or suffer dismissal from the Army. In December 1870, Grant submitted to Congress the names of the new appointees, most of whom were confirmed by the Senate.

Red Cloud White House visit
Grant's Peace policy received a boost when Chief of the Oglala Sioux Red Cloud, Maȟpíya Lúta, and Brulé Sioux Spotted Tail, Siŋté Glešká, arrived in Washington D.C. and met Grant at the White House for a bountiful state dinner on May 7, 1870. Red Cloud, at a previous meeting with Secretary Cox and Commissioner Parker, complained that promised rations and arms for hunting had not been delivered. Afterward, Grant and Cox lobbied Congress for the promised supplies and rations. Congress responded and on July 15, 1870, Grant signed the Indian Appropriations Act into law that appropriated the tribal monies. Two days after Spotted Tail urged the Grant administration to keep white settlers from invading Native reservation land, Grant ordered all Generals in the West to "keep intruders off by military force if necessary". In 1871, Grant signed another Indians Appropriations Act that ended the governmental policy of treating tribes as independent sovereign nations. Natives would be treated as individuals or wards of the state and Indian policies would be legislated by Congressional statutes.

Peace policy
At the core of the Peace Policy was putting the western reservations under the control of religious denominations. In 1872, the implementation of the policy involved the allotting of Indian reservations to religious organizations as exclusive religious domains. Of the 73 agencies assigned, the Methodists received fourteen; the Orthodox Friends ten; the Presbyterians nine; the Episcopalians eight; the Roman Catholics seven; the Hicksite Friends six; the Baptists five; the Dutch Reformed five; the Congregationalists three; Christians two; Unitarians two; American Board of Commissioners for Foreign Missions one; and Lutherans one. Infighting between competitive missionary groups over the distribution of agencies was detrimental to Grant's Peace Policy. The selection criteria were vague and some critics saw the Peace Policy as violating Native American freedom of religion. In another setback, William Welsh, a prominent merchant, prosecuted the Bureau in a Congressional investigation over malfeasance. Although Parker was exonerated, legislation passed Congress that authorized the board to approve goods and services payments by vouchers from the Bureau. Parker resigned office, and Grant replaced Parker with reformer Francis A. Walker.

Domestic affairs

Holidays law
On June 28, 1870, Grant approved and signed legislation that made Christmas, or December 25, a legal federal public Holiday within Washington D.C. Historian Ron White said this was done by Grant because of his passion to unify the nation. During the early 19th Century in the United States, Christmas became more of a family-centered activity. Other Holidays, included in the law within Washington D.C., were New Year, Fourth of July, and Thanksgiving. The law affected 5,300 federal employees working in the District of Columbia, the nation's capital. The legislation was meant to adapt to similar laws in states surrounding Washington D.C. and "in every State of the Union."

Utah territory polygamy

In 1862, during the American Civil War President Lincoln signed into law the Morrill bill that outlawed polygamy in all U.S. Territories. Mormons who practiced polygamy in Utah, for the most part, resisted the Morrill law and the territorial governor. During the 1868 election, Grant had mentioned he would enforce the law against polygamy. Tensions began as early as 1870, when Mormons in Ogden, Utah began to arm themselves and practice military drilling. By the Fourth of July, 1871 Mormon militia in Salt Lake City, Utah were on the verge of fighting territorial troops; however, more level heads prevailed and violence was averted.
Grant, however, who believed Utah was in a state of rebellion was determined to arrest those who practiced polygamy outlawed under the Morrill Act. In October 1871 hundreds of Mormons were rounded up by U.S. marshals, put in a prison camp, arrested, and put on trial for polygamy. One convicted polygamist received a $500 fine and 3 years in prison under hard labor. On November 20, 1871, Mormon leader Brigham Young, in ill health, had been charged with polygamy. Young's attorney stated that Young had no intention to flee the court. Other persons during the polygamy shut down were charged with murder or intent to kill. The Morrill Act, however, proved hard to enforce since proof of marriage was required for conviction. Grant personally found polygamy morally offensive. On December 4, 1871, Grant said polygamists in Utah were "a remnant of barbarism, repugnant to civilization, to decency, and to the laws of the United States."

Comstock Act

In March 1873, anti-obscenity moralists, led by Anthony Comstock, secretary of the New York Society for the Suppression of Vice, easily secured passage of the Comstock Act which made it a federal crime to mail articles "for any indecent or immoral use". Grant signed the bill after he was assured that Comstock would personally enforce it. Comstock went on to become a special agent of the Post Office appointed by Secretary James Cresswell. Comstock prosecuted pornographers, imprisoned abortionists, banned nude art, stopped the mailing of information about contraception, and tried to ban what he considered bad books.

Early suffrage movement

During Grant's presidency the early Women's suffrage movement led by Susan B. Anthony and Elizabeth Cady Stanton gained national attention. Anthony lobbied for female suffrage, equal gender pay, and protection of property for women who resided in Washington D.C. In April 1869, Grant signed into law the protection of married women's property from their husbands' debts and the ability for women to sue in court in Washington D.C. In March 1870 Representative Samuel M. Arnell introduced a bill, coauthored by suffragist Bennette Lockwood, that would give women federal workers equal pay for equal work. Two years later Grant signed a modified Senate version of the Arnell Bill into law. The law required that all federal female clerks would be paid the fully compensated salary; however, lower tiered female clerks were exempted. The law increased women's clerk salaries from 4% to 20% during the 1870s; however, the culture of patronage and patriarchy continued. To placate the burgeoning suffragist movement, the Republicans' platform included that women's rights should be treated with "respectful consideration", while Grant advocated equal rights for all citizens.

Yellowstone and conservation

An enduring hallmark of the Grant administration was the creation of Yellowstone, the world's first national park. Organized exploration of the upper Yellowstone River began in fall 1869 when the Cook–Folsom–Peterson Expedition made a month-long journey up the Yellowstone River and into the geyser basins. In 1870, the somewhat more official Washburn–Langford–Doane Expedition explored the same regions of the upper Yellowstone and geyser basins, naming Old Faithful and many other park features. Official reports from Lieutenant Gustavus Cheyney Doane and Scribner's Monthly accounts by Nathaniel P. Langford brought increased public awareness to the natural wonders of the region. Influenced by Jay Cooke of the Northern Pacific Railroad and Langford's public speeches about the Yellowstone on the East Coast, geologist Ferdinand Hayden sought funding from Congress for an expedition under the auspices of the U.S. Geological Survey. In March 1871 Grant signed into law Congressional legislation appropriating $40,000 to finance the Hayden Geological Survey of 1871. Hayden was given instructions by Grant's Secretary of Interior, Columbus Delano. The expedition party was composed of 36 civilians, mostly scientists, and two military escorts. Among the survey party were an artist Thomas Moran and photographer William Henry Jackson.

Hayden's published reports, magazine articles, along with paintings by Moran and photographs by Jackson convinced Congress to preserve the natural wonders of the upper Yellowstone. On December 18, 1871, a bill was introduced simultaneously in the Senate, by Senator S.C. Pomeroy of Kansas, and in the House of Representatives, by Congressman William H. Clagett of the Montana Territory, for the establishment of a park at the headwaters of the Yellowstone River. Hayden's influence on Congress is readily apparent when examining the detailed information contained in the report of the House Committee on Public Lands: "The bill now before Congress has for its objective the withdrawal from settlement, occupancy, or sale, under the laws of the United States a tract of land fifty-five by sixty-five miles, about the sources of the Yellowstone and Missouri Rivers, and dedicates and sets apart as a great national park or pleasure-ground for the benefit and enjoyment of the people."
When the bill was presented to Congress, the bill's chief supporters, ably prepared by Langford, Hayden and Jay Cooke, convinced their colleagues that the region's real value was as a park area, to be preserved in its natural state. The bill was approved by a comfortable margin in the Senate on January 30, 1872, and by the House on February 27.

On March 1, 1872, Grant played his role, in signing the "Act of Dedication" into law. It established the Yellowstone region as the nation's first national park, made possible by three years of exploration by Cook-Folsom-Peterson (1869), Washburn-Langford-Doane (1870), and Hayden (1871). The 1872 Yellowstone Act prohibited fish and game, including buffalo, from "wanton destruction" within the confines of the park. However, Congress did not appropriate funds or legislation for the enforcement against poaching; as a result, Secretary Delano could not hire people to aid tourists or protect Yellowstone from encroachment. By the 1880s buffalo herds dwindled to only a few hundred, a majority found mostly in Yellowstone National Park. As the Indian wars ended, Congress appropriated money and enforcement legislation in 1894, signed into law by President Grover Cleveland, that protected and preserved buffalo and other wildlife in Yellowstone. Grant also signed legislation that protected northern fur seals on Alaska's Pribilof Islands. This was the first law in U.S. history that specifically protected wildlife on federally owned land.

End of the buffalo herds

In 1872, around two thousand white buffalo hunters working between Kansas, and Arkansas were killing buffalo for their hides by the many thousands.  The demand was for boots for European armies, or machine belts attached to steam engines. Acres of land were dedicated solely for drying the hides of the slaughtered buffalo. Native Americans protested at the "wanton destruction" of their food supply. Between 1872 in 1874, the buffalo herd south of the Platte River yielded 4.4 million kills by white hunters, and about 1 million animals killed by Indians.  Popular concern for the destruction of the buffalo mounted, and a bill in Congress was passed, HR 921, that would have made buffalo hunting illegal for whites. Taking advice from Secretary Delano, Grant chose to pocket-veto the bill, believing that the demise of the buffalo would reduce Indian wars and force tribes to stay on their respected reservations and to adopt an agricultural lifestyle rather than roaming the plains and hunting buffalo. Ranchers wanted the buffalo gone to open pasture land for their cattle herds. With the buffalo food supply lowered, Native Americans were forced to stay on reservations.

Reforms and scandals

Civil service commission
The reform of the spoils system of political patronage entered the national agenda under the Grant presidency, and would take on the fervor of a religious revival. The distribution of federal jobs by Congressional legislators was considered vital for their reelection to Congress. Grant required that all applicants to federal jobs apply directly to the Department heads, rather than the president. Two of Grant's appointments, Secretary of Interior Jacob D. Cox and Secretary of Treasury George S. Boutwell put in place examinations in their respected departments advocated by reformers.  Grant and all reformers agreed that the prevailing system of appointments was unsound, for it maximized party advantage and minimized efficiency and the nonpartisan interest of good government. Historian John Simon says his efforts at civil service reform were honest, but that they were met with criticism from all sides and were a failure.

Grant was the first president to recommend a professional civil service. He pushed the initial legislation through Congress, and appointed the members for the first United States Civil Service Commission. The temporary Commission recommended administering competitive exams and issuing regulations on the hiring and promotion of government employees. Grant ordered their recommendations in effect in 1872; having lasted for two years until December 1874. At the New York Custom House, a port that took in hundreds of millions of dollars a year in revenue, applicants for an entry position now had to pass a written civil service examination. Chester A. Arthur who was appointed by Grant as New York Custom Collector stated that the examinations excluded and deterred unfit persons from getting employment positions. However, Congress, in no mood to reform itself, denied any long-term reform by refusing to enact the necessary legislation to make the changes permanent. Historians have traditionally been divided whether patronage, meaning appointments made without a merit system, should be labeled corruption.

The movement for Civil Service reform reflected two distinct objectives: to eliminate the corruption and inefficiencies in a non-professional bureaucracy and to check the power of President Johnson. Although many reformers after the Election of 1868 looked to Grant to ram Civil Service legislation through Congress, he refused, saying:

Grant used patronage to build his party and help his friends. He protected those whom he thought were the victims of injustice or attacks by his enemies, even if they were guilty. Grant believed in loyalty to his friends, as one writer called it the "Chivalry of Friendship".

New York Custom House Ring

Prior to the presidential election of 1872 two congressional and one Treasury Department investigations took place over corruption at the New York Custom House under Grant collector appointments Moses H. Grinnell and Thomas Murphy. Private warehouses were taking imported goods from the docks and charging shippers storage fees. Grant's friend, George K. Leet, was allegedly involved with exorbitant pricing for storing goods and splitting the profits. Grant's third collector appointment, Chester A. Arthur, implemented Secretary of Treasury George S. Boutwell's reform to keep the goods protected on the docks rather than private storage.

Star Route Postal Ring

In the early 1870s during the Grant Administration, lucrative postal route contracts were given to local contractors on the Pacific Coast and Southern regions of the United States. These were known as Star Routes because an asterisk was given on official Post Office documents. These remote routes were hundreds of miles long and went to the most rural parts of the United States by horse and buggy. In obtaining these highly prized postal contracts, an intricate ring of bribery and straw bidding was set up in the Postal Contract office; the ring consisted of contractors, postal clerks, and various intermediary brokers. Straw bidding was at its highest practice while John Creswell, Grant's 1869 appointment, was Postmaster-General. An 1872 federal investigation into the matter exonerated Creswell, but he was censured by the minority House report. A $40,000 bribe to the 42nd Congress by one postal contractor had tainted the results of the investigation. In 1876, another congressional investigation under a Democratic House shut down the postal ring for a few years.

The Salary Grab
On March 3, 1873, Grant signed a law that authorized the president's salary to be increased from $25,000 a year to $50,000 a year and Congressmen's salaries to be increased by $2,500. Representatives also received a retroactive pay bonus for the previous two years of service. This was done in secret and attached to a general appropriations bill. Reforming newspapers quickly exposed the law and the bonus was repealed in January 1874. Grant missed an opportunity to veto the bill and to make a strong statement for good government.

Election of 1872

As his first term entered its final year, Grant remained popular throughout the nation despite the accusations of corruption that were swirling around his administration. When Republicans gathered for their 1872 national convention he was unanimously nominated for a second term. Henry Wilson was selected as his running mate over scandal-tainted Vice President Schuyler Colfax. The party platform advocated high tariffs and a continuation of Radical Reconstruction policies that supported five military districts in the Southern states.

During Grant's first term a significant number of Republicans had become completely disillusioned with the party. Weary of the scandals and opposed to several of Grant's policies, split from the party to form the Liberal Republican Party. At the party's only national convention, held in May 1872 New York Tribune editor Horace Greeley was nominated for president, and Benjamin Gratz Brown was nominated for vice president. They advocated civil service reform, a low tariff, and granting amnesty to former Confederate soldiers. They also wanted to end reconstruction and restore local self-government in the South.

The Democrats, who at this time had no strong candidate choice of their own, saw an opportunity to consolidate the anti-Grant vote and jumped on the Greeley bandwagon, reluctantly adopting Greeley and Brown as their nominees. It is the only time in American history when a major party endorsed the candidate of a third party.

While Grant, like incumbent presidents before him, did not campaign, an efficient party organization composed of thousands of patronage appointees, did so on his behalf. Frederick Douglass supported Grant and reminded black voters that Grant had destroyed the violent Ku Klux Klan. Greeley embarked on a five-state campaign tour in late September, during which he delivered nearly 200 speeches. His campaign was plagued by misstatements and embarrassing moments.

However, because of political infighting between Liberal Republicans and Democrats, and due to several campaign blunders, the physically ailing Greeley was no match for Grant, who won in a landslide. Grant won 286 of the 352 Electoral College votes and received 55.8 percent of the popular vote nationwide. The President's reelection victory also brought an overwhelming Republican majority into both houses of Congress. Heartbroken after a hard-fought political campaign, Greeley died a few weeks after the election. Out of respect for Greeley, Grant attended his funeral.

Second term 1873–1877

The second inauguration of Ulysses Grant's presidency was held on Tuesday, March 4, 1873, commencing the second four-year term of his presidency. Subsequently, the inaugural ball ended early when the food froze. Departing from the White House, a parade escorted Grant down the newly paved Pennsylvania Avenue, which was all decorated with banners and flags, on to the swearing-in ceremony in front of the Capitol building. Chief Justice Salmon P. Chase administered the presidential oath of office. This was one of the coldest inaugurations in U.S. history, with the temperature at only 6 degrees at sunrise. After the swearing-in ceremony the inaugural parade commenced down Pennsylvania. The Evening Star observed. "The private stands and windows along the entire route were crowded to excess." The parade consisted of a variety of military units along with marching bands, and civic organizations. The military units, in their fancy regalia, were the most noticeable. Altogether there were approximately 12,000 marchers who participated, including several units of African-American soldiers. At the inaugural ball there were some 6,000 people in attendance. Great care was taken to ensure that Grant's inaugural ball would be in spacious quarters and would feature an elegant assortment of appetizers, food, and champagne. A large temporary wooden building was constructed at Judiciary Square to accommodate the event. Grant arrived around 11:30pm and the dancing began.

It was the only term of Henry Wilson as vice president. Wilson died 2 years, 263 days into this term, and the office remained vacant for the balance of it.

Reconstruction

Grant was vigorous in his enforcement of the 14th and 15th amendments and prosecuted thousands of persons who violated African American civil rights; he used military force to put down political insurrections in Louisiana, Mississippi, and South Carolina. He proactively used military and Justice Department enforcement of civil rights laws and the protection of African Americans more than any other 19th-century president. He used his full powers to weaken the Ku Klux Klan, reducing violence and intimidation in the South. He appointed James Milton Turner as the first African American minister to a foreign nation. Grant's relationship with Charles Sumner, the leader in promoting civil rights, was shattered by the Senator's opposition to Grant's plan to acquire Santo Domingo by treaty. Grant retaliated, firing men Sumner had recommended and having allies strip Sumner of his chairmanship of the Foreign Relations Committee. Sumner joined the Liberal Republican movement in 1872 to fight Grant's reelection.

Conservative resistance to Republican state governments grew after the 1872 elections. With the destruction of the Klan in 1872, new secret paramilitary organizations arose in the Deep South. In Mississippi, North Carolina, South Carolina, and Louisiana, the Red Shirts and White League operated openly and were better organized than the Ku Klux Klan. Their goals were to oust the Republicans, return Conservative whites to power, and use whatever illegal methods needed to achieve them. Being loyal to his veterans, Grant remained determined that African Americans would receive protection.

Colfax Massacre

After the November 4, 1872, election, Louisiana was a split state. In a controversial election, two candidates were claiming victory as governor. Violence was used to intimidate black Republicans. The fusionist party of Liberal Republicans and Democrats claimed John McEnery as the victor, while the Republicans claimed U.S. Senator William P. Kellogg. Two months later each candidate was sworn in as governor on January 13, 1873. A federal judge ruled that Kellogg was the rightful winner of the election and ordered him and the Republican-based majority to be seated. The White League supported McEnery and prepared to use military force to remove Kellogg from office. Grant ordered troops to enforce the court order and protect Kellogg. On March 4, Federal troops under a flag of truce and Kellogg's state militia defeated McEnery's fusionist party's insurrection.

A dispute arose over who would be installed as judge and sheriff at the Colfax courthouse in Grant Parish. Kellogg's two appointees had seized control of the Court House on March 25 with aid and protection of black state militia troops. Then on April 13, White League forces attacked the courthouse and massacred 50 black militiamen who had been captured. A total of 105 blacks were killed trying to defend the Colfax courthouse for Governor Kellogg. On April 21, Grant sent in the U.S. 19th Infantry Regiment to restore order. On May 22, Grant issued a new proclamation to restore order in Louisiana. On May 31, McEnery finally told his followers to obey "peremptory orders" of the President. The orders brought a brief peace to New Orleans and most of Louisiana, except, ironically, Grant Parish.

Brooks-Baxter war in Arkansas

In the fall of 1872, the Republican party split in Arkansas and ran two candidates for governor, Elisha Baxter and Joseph Brooks. Massive fraud characterized the election, but Baxter was declared the winner and took office. Brooks never gave up; finally, in 1874, a local judge ruled Brooks was entitled to the office and swore him in. Both sides mobilized militia units, and rioting and fighting bloodied the streets. Speculation swirled as to who President Grant would side with – either Baxter or Brooks. Grant delayed, requesting a joint session of the Arkansas government to figure out peacefully who would be the Governor, but Baxter refused to participate. On May 15, 1874, Grant issued a Proclamation that Baxter was the legitimate Governor of Arkansas, and hostilities ceased. In the fall of 1874 the people of Arkansas voted out Baxter, and Republicans and the Redeemers came to power.

A few months later in early 1875, Grant announced that Brooks had been legitimately elected back in 1872. Grant did not send in troops, and Brooks never regained office. Instead, Grant appointed him to the high-paying patronage job of US postmaster in Little Rock.  Grant's legalistic approach did resolve the conflict peacefully, but it left the Republican Party in Arkansas in total disarray, and further discredited Grant's reputation.

Vicksburg riots
In August 1874, the Vicksburg city government elected White reform party candidates consisting of Republicans and Democrats. They promised to lower city spending and taxes. Despite such intentions, the reform movement turned racist when the new White city officials went after the county government, which had a majority of African Americans. The White League threatened the life of and expelled Crosby, the black Warren County Sheriff and tax collector. Crosby sought help from Republican Governor Adelbert Ames to regain his position as sheriff. Governor Ames told him to take other African Americans and use force to retain his lawful position. At that time Vicksburg had a population of 12,443, more than half of whom were African American.

On December 7, 1874, Crosby and an African-American militia approached Vicksburg. He had said that the Whites were, "ruffians, barbarians, and political banditti". A series of confrontations occurred against white paramilitary forces that resulted in the deaths of 29 African Americans and 2 Whites. The White militia retained control of the County Court House and jail.

On December 21, Grant issued a Presidential Proclamation for the people in Vicksburg to stop fighting. General Philip Sheridan, based in Louisiana for this regional territory, dispatched federal troops, who reinstated Crosby as sheriff and restored the peace. When questioned about the matter, Governor Ames denied that he had told Crosby to use African-American militia. On June 7, 1875, Crosby was shot to death by a white deputy while drinking in a bar. The origins of the shooting remained a mystery.

Louisiana revolt and coups
On September 14, 1874, the White League and Democratic militia took control of the state house at New Orleans, and the Republican Governor William P. Kellogg was forced to flee. Former Confederate General James A. Longstreet, with 3,000 African American militia and 400 Metropolitan police, made a counterattack on the 8,000 White League troops. Consisting of former Confederate soldiers, the experienced White League troops routed Longstreet's army. On September 17, Grant sent in Federal troops, and they restored the government back to Kellogg. During the following controversial election in November, passions rose high, and violence mixed with fraud were rampant; the state of affairs in New Orleans was becoming out of control. The results were that 53 Republicans and 53 Democrats were elected with 5 remaining seats to be decided by the legislature.

Grant had been careful to watch the elections and secretly sent Phil Sheridan in to keep law and order in the state. Sheridan had arrived in New Orleans a few days before the January 4, 1875, legislature opening meeting. At the convention the Democrats again with military force took control of the state building out of Republican hands. Initially, the Democrats were protected by federal troops under Colonel Régis de Trobriand, and the escaped Republicans were removed from the hallways of the state building. However, Governor Kellogg then requested that Trobriand reseat the Republicans. Trobriand returned to the Statehouse and used bayonets to force the Democrats out of the building. The Republicans then organized their own house with their own speakers all being protected by the Federal Army. Sheridan, who had annexed the Department of the Gulf to his command at 9:00 p.m., claimed that the federal troops were being neutral since they had also protected the Democrats earlier.

Civil Rights Act of 1875

Throughout his presidency, Grant was continually concerned with the civil rights of all Americans, "irrespective of nationality, color, or religion."  Grant had no role in writing the Civil Rights Act of 1875 but he did sign it a few days before the Republicans lost control of Congress. The new law was designed to allow everyone access to public eating establishments, hotels, and places of entertainment. This was done particularly to protect African Americans who were discriminated across United States. The bill was also passed in honor of Senator Charles Sumner who had previously attempted to pass a civil rights bill in 1872. In his sixth message to Congress, he summed up his own views, "While I remain Executive all the laws of Congress and the provisions of the Constitution ... will be enforced with rigor ... Treat the Negro as a citizen and a voter, as he is and must remain ... Then we shall have no complaint of sectional interference." In the pursued equal justice for all category from the 2009 C-SPAN presidential rating survey Grant scored a 9 getting into the top ten. The Civil Rights Act of 1875 proved a very little value to Blacks. The Justice Department and the federal judges generally refused to enforce it, and the Supreme Court declared it unconstitutional in 1883.  Historian William Gillette calls it "an insignificant victory."

South Carolina 1876

During the election year of 1876, South Carolina was in a state of rebellion against Republican governor Daniel H. Chamberlain. Conservatives were determined to win the election for ex-Confederate Wade Hampton through violence and intimidation. The Republicans went on to nominate Chamberlain for a second term. Hampton supporters, donning red shirts, disrupted Republican meetings with gun shootings and yelling. Tensions became violent on July 8, 1876, when five African Americans were murdered at Hamburg. The rifle clubs, wearing their Red Shirts, were better armed than the blacks. South Carolina was ruled more by "mobocracy and bloodshed" than by Chamberlain's government.

Black militia fought back in Charleston on September 6, 1876, in what was known as the "King Street riot". The white militia assumed defensive positions out of concern over possible intervention from federal troops. Then, on September 19, the Red Shirts took offensive action by openly killing between 30 and 50 African Americans outside Ellenton. During the massacre, state representative Simon Coker was killed. On October 7, Governor Chamberlain declared martial law and told all the "rifle club" members to put down their weapons. In the meantime, Wade Hampton never ceased to remind Chamberlain that he did not rule South Carolina. Out of desperation, Chamberlain wrote to Grant and asked for federal intervention. The "Cainhoy riot" took place on October 15 when Republicans held a rally at "Brick Church" outside Cainhoy. Blacks and whites both opened fire; six whites and one black were killed. Grant, upset over the Ellenton and Cainhoy riots, finally declared a Presidential Proclamation on October 17, 1876, and ordered all persons, within 3 days, to cease their lawless activities and disperse to their homes. A total of 1,144 federal infantrymen were sent into South Carolina, and the violence stopped; election day was quiet. Both Hampton and Chamberlain claimed victory, and for a while both acted as governor; Hampton took the office in 1877 after President Rutherford B. Hayes withdrew federal troops and after Chamberlain left the state.

Financial affairs

Panic of 1873

Between 1868 and 1873, the American economy was robust, primarily caused by railroad building, manufacturing expansion, and thriving agriculture production. Financial debt, however, particularly in railroad investment, spread throughout both the private and federal sectors. The market began to break in July 1873 when the Brooklyn Trust Company went broke and closed. Secretary Richardson sold gold to pay for $14 million in federal bonds. Two months later, the Panic of 1873, collapsed the national economy. On September 17, the stock market crashed, followed by the New York Warehouse & Security Company, September 18, and the Jay Cooke & Company, September 19, both going bankrupt. On September 19, Grant ordered Secretary Richardson, Boutwell's replacement, to purchase $10 million in bonds. Richardson complied using greenbacks to expand the money supply. On September 20, the New York Stock Exchange (NYSE) closed for ten days. Traveling to New York, Grant met with Richardson to consult with bankers, who gave Grant conflicting financial advice.

Returning to Washington, Grant and Richardson sent millions of greenbacks from the treasury to New York to purchase bonds, stopping the purchases on September 24. By the beginning of January 1874, Richardson had issued a total of $26 million greenbacks from the Treasury reserve, into the economy, relieving Wall Street, but not stopping the national Long Depression, that would last 5 years. Thousands of businesses, depressed daily wages by 25% for three years, and brought the unemployment rate up to 14%.

Inflation bill vetoed and compromise

Grant and Richardson's mildly inflationary response to the Panic of 1873, encouraged Congress to pursue a more aggressive policy. The legality of releasing greenbacks was presumed to have been illegal. On April 14, 1874, Congress passed the Inflation Bill that set the greenback maximum at $400,000 retroactively legalizing the $26 million reserve greenbacks earlier released by the Treasury. The bill released an additional $18 million in greenbacks up to the original $400,000,000 amount. Going further, the bill authorized an additional $46 million in banknotes and raised their maximum to $400 million. Eastern bankers vigorously lobbied Grant to veto the bill because of their reliance on bonds and foreign investors who did business in gold. Most of Grant's cabinet favored the bill in order to secure a Republican election. Grant's conservative Secretary of State Hamilton Fish threatened to resign if Grant signed the bill. On April 22, 1874, after evaluating his own reasons for wanting to sign the bill, Grant unexpectedly vetoed the bill against the popular election strategy of the Republican Party because he believed it would destroy the nation's credit.

Congress passed a compromise bill, that Grant signed on June 20, 1874. The act legalized the $26 million released by Richardson, and set the maximum of greenbacks at $382 million. Up to $55 million in national banknotes would be redistributed from states with an excess to those states that had minimal amounts. The act did little to relieve the national economy

Resumption of Specie Act
On January 14, 1875, Grant signed the Resumption of Specie Act, and he could not have been happier; he wrote a note to Congress congratulating members on the passage of the act. The legislation was drafted by Ohio Republican Senator John Sherman. This act provided that paper money in circulation would be exchanged for gold specie and silver coins and would be effective January 1, 1879. The act also implemented that gradual steps would be taken to reduce the number of greenbacks in circulation. At that time there were "paper coin" currency worth less than $1.00, and these would be exchanged for silver coins. Its effect was to stabilize the currency and make the consumers money as "good as gold". In an age without a Federal Reserve system to control inflation, this act stabilized the economy. Grant considered it the hallmark of his administration.

Foreign affairs

Historians credit Secretary of State Hamilton Fish with a highly effective foreign policy. Ronald Cedric White says of Grant, "everyone agreed he chose well when he appointed Hamilton Fish secretary of state."

Virginus incident

On October 31, 1873, a steamer Virginius, flying the American flag carrying war materials and men to aid the Cuban insurrection (in violation of American and Spanish law) was intercepted and taken to Cuba. After a hasty trial, the local Spanish officials executed 53 would-be insurgents, eight of whom were United States citizens; orders from Madrid to delay the executions arrived too late. War scares erupted in both the U.S. and Spain, heightened by the bellicose dispatches from the American minister in Madrid, retired general Daniel Sickles. Secretary of State Fish kept a cool demeanor in the crisis, and through investigation discovered there was a question over whether the Virginius ship had the right to bear the United States flag. The Spanish Republic's president Emilio Castelar expressed profound regret for the tragedy and was willing to make reparations through arbitration. Fish negotiated reparations with the Spanish minister Senor Polo de Barnabé. With Grant's approval, Spain was to surrender Virginius, pay an indemnity to the surviving families of the Americans executed, and salute the American flag; the episode ended quietly.

Hawaiian free trade treaty
In December 1874, Grant held a state dinner at the White House for the King of Hawaii, David Kalakaua, who was seeking the importation of Hawaiian sugar duty-free to the United States. Grant and Fish were able to produce a successful free trade treaty in 1875 with the Kingdom of Hawaii, incorporating the Pacific islands' sugar industry into the United States' economy sphere.

Liberian-Grebo war
James Milton Turner, the first African American ambassador from the United States, requested that a warship be sent to protect American property in Liberia, a former American colony. After Alaska arrived, Turner negotiated the incorporation of Grebo people into Liberian society and the ousting of foreign traders from Liberia.

Native American affairs

Under Grant's Peace policy, wars between settlers, the federal army, and the American Indians had been decreasing from 101 per year in 1869 to a low of 15 per year in 1875. However, the discovery of gold in the Black Hills of the Dakota Territory and the completion of the Northern Pacific Railway, threatened to unravel Grant's Indian policy, as white settlers encroached upon native land to mine for gold.

In his second term of presidential office, Grant's fragile Peace policy came apart. Major General Edward Canby was killed in the Modoc War. Indian wars per year jumped up to 32 in 1876 and remained at 43 in 1877. One of the highest casualty Indian battles that took place in American history was at the Battle of Little Bighorn in 1876. Indian war casualties in Montana went from 5 in 1875, to 613 in 1876 and 436 in 1877.

Modoc War

In January 1873, Grant's Native American peace policy was challenged. Two weeks after Grant was elected for a second term, fighting broke out between the Modocs and settlers near the California-Oregon border. The Modocs, led by Captain Jack, killed 18 white settlers and then found a strong defensive position. Grant ordered General Sherman not to attack the Indians but settle matters peacefully with a commission. Sherman then sent Major General Edward Canby, but Captain Jack killed him. Reverend Eleazar Thomas, a Methodist minister, was also killed. Alfred B. Meacham, an Indian Agent, was severely wounded. The murders shocked the nation, and Sherman wired to have the Modocs exterminated. Grant overruled Sherman; Captain Jack was executed, and the remaining 155 Modocs were relocated to the Quapaw Agency in the Indian Territory. This episode and the Great Sioux War undermined public confidence in Grant's peace policy, according to historian Robert M. Utley. During the peace negotiations between Brig. Gen. Edward Canby and the Modoc tribal leaders, there were more Indians in the tent then had been agreed upon. As the Indians grew more hostile, Captain Jack, said "I talk no more." and shouted "All ready." Captain Jack drew his revolver and fired directly into the head of Gen Canby. Brig. Gen Canby was the highest-ranking officer to be killed during the Indian Wars that took place from 1850 to 1890. Alfred Meacham, who survived the massacre, defended the Modocs who were put on trial.

Red River War

In 1874, war erupted on the southern Plains when Quanah Parker, leader of the Comanche, led 700 tribal warriors and attacked the buffalo hunter supply base on the Canadian River, at Adobe Walls, Texas. The Army under General Phil Sheridan launched a military campaign, and, with few casualties on either side, forced the Indians back to their reservations by destroying their horses and winter food supplies. Grant, who agreed to the Army plan advocated by Generals William T. Sherman and Phil Sheridan, imprisoned 74 insurgents in Florida.

Great Sioux War

In 1874 gold had been discovered in the Black Hills in the Dakota Territory. White speculators and settlers rushed in droves seeking riches mining gold on land reserved for the Sioux tribe by the Treaty of Fort Laramie of 1868. In 1875, to avoid conflict Grant met with Red Cloud, chief of the Sioux and offered $25,000 from the government to purchase the land. The offer was declined. On November 3, 1875, at a White House meeting, Phil Sheridan told the President that the Army was overstretched and could not defend the Sioux tribe from the settlers; Grant ordered Sheridan to round up the Sioux and put them on the reservation. Sheridan used a strategy of convergence, using Army columns to force the Sioux onto the reservation. On June 25, 1876, one of these columns, led by Colonel George A. Custer met the Sioux at the Battle of Little Big Horn and part of his command was slaughtered. Approximately 253 federal soldiers and civilians were killed compared to 40 Indians. Custer's death and the Battle of Little Big Horn shocked the nation. Sheridan avenged Custer, pacified the northern Plains, and put the defeated Sioux on the reservation. On August 15, 1876, President Grant signed a proviso giving the Sioux nation $1,000,000 in rations, while the Sioux relinquished all rights to the Black Hills, except for a 40-mile land tract west of the 103rd meridian. On August 28, a seven-man committee, appointed by Grant, gave additional harsh stipulations for the Sioux in order to receive government assistance. Halfbreeds and "squaw men" (A white man with an Indian wife) were banished from the Sioux reservation. To receive the government rations, the Indians had to work the land. Reluctantly, on September 20, the Indian leaders, whose people were starving, agreed to the committee's demands and signed the agreement.

During the Great Sioux War, Grant came into conflict with Col. George Armstrong Custer after he testified in 1876 about corruption in the War Department under Secretary William W. Belknap (see below). Grant had Custer arrested for breach of military protocol in Chicago and barred him from leading an upcoming campaign against the Sioux. Grant finally relented and let Custer fight under Brig. Gen. Alfred Terry. Two months after Custer's death Grant castigated him in the press, saying "I regard Custer's massacre as a sacrifice of troops, brought on by Custer himself, that was wholly unnecessary – wholly unnecessary." As the nation was shocked by the death of Custer, Grant's peace policy became militaristic; Congress appropriated funds for 2,500 more troops, two more forts were constructed, the army took over the Indian agencies and Indians were barred from purchasing rifles and ammunition.

Domestic affairs

Religion and schools

Grant believed strongly in the separation of church and state and championed complete secularization in public schools. In a September 1875 speech, Grant advocated "security of free thought, free speech, and free press, pure morals, unfettered religious sentiments, and of equal rights and privileges to all men, irrespective of nationality, color, or religion." In regard to public education, Grant endorsed that every child should receive "the opportunity of a good common school education, unmixed with sectarian, pagan, or atheist tenets. Leave the matter of religion to the family altar, the church, and the private schools... Keep the church and the state forever separate."

In a speech in 1875 to a veteran's meeting,  Grant called for a Constitutional amendment that would mandate free public schools and prohibit the use of public money for sectarian schools. He was echoing nativist sentiments that were strong in his Republican Party. Tyler Anbinder says, "Grant was not an obsessive nativist. He expressed his resentment of immigrants and animus toward Catholicism only rarely. But these sentiments reveal themselves frequently enough in his writings and major actions as general....In the 1850s he joined a Know Nothing lodge and irrationally blamed immigrants for setbacks in his career."

Grant laid out his agenda for "good common school education". He attacked government support for "sectarian schools" run by religious organizations, and called for the defense of public education "unmixed with sectarian, pagan or atheistical dogmas." Grant declared that "Church and State" should be "forever separate." Religion, he said, should be left to families, churches, and private schools devoid of public funds.

After Grant's speech Republican Congressman James G. Blaine (1830–1893) proposed the amendment to the federal Constitution. Blaine, who actively sought Catholic votes when he ran for president in 1884, believed that possibility of hurtful agitation on the school question should be ended. In 1875, the proposed amendment passed by a vote of 180 to 7 in the House of Representatives, but failed by four votes to achieve the necessary two-thirds vote in the Senate. Nothing like it ever became federal legislation. However many states did adopt similar amendments to their state constitution.

The proposed Blaine Amendment text was:

Polygamy and Chinese prostitution
In October 1875, Grant traveled to Utah and was surprised that the Mormons treated him kindly. He told Utah territorial governor, George W. Emery, that he had been deceived concerning the Mormons. However, on December 7, 1875, after his return to Washington, Grant wrote to Congress in his seventh annual State of the Union address that as "an institution polygamy should be banished from the land…"
Grant believed that polygamy negatively affected children and women. Grant advocated that a second law, stronger than the Morrill Act, be passed to "punish so flagrant a crime against decency and morality."

Grant also denounced the immigration of Chinese women into the United States for the purposes of prostitution, saying that it was "no less an evil" than polygamy.

Interactions with Jews
Grant publicly stated regret for his offensive wartime order expelling Jewish traders. In his army days he traded at a local store operated by the Seligman brothers, two Jewish merchants who became Grant's lifelong friends. They became wealthy bankers who donated substantially to Grant's presidential campaign.  After the wartime order, however, the Jewish community was angry with Grant. 
While running for president, in 1868, Grant publicly apologized for the expulsion order, and once elected, he took actions intended to make amends. He appointed several Jewish leaders to office, including Simon Wolf recorder of deeds in Washington D.C., and Edward S. Salomon Governor of the Washington Territory.  Historian Jonathan Sarna argues:

Eager to prove that he was above prejudice, Grant appointed more Jews to public office than had any of his predecessors and, in the name of human rights, he extended unprecedented support to persecuted Jews in Russia and Romania. Time and again, partly as a result of this enlarged vision of what it meant to be an American and partly in order to live down General Orders No. 11, Grant consciously worked to assist Jews and secure them equality. ... Through his appointments and policies, Grant rejected calls for a 'Christian nation' and embraced Jews as insiders in America, part of 'we the people.' During his administration, Jews achieved heightened status on the national scene, anti-Jewish prejudice declined, and Jews looked forward optimistically to a liberal epoch characterized by sensitivity to human rights and interreligious cooperation.

Midterm election 1874 

As the 1874 midterm elections approached, three scandals, the Crédit Mobilier, the Salary Grab, and the Sanborn incident caused the public to view the Republican Party as mired in corruption. The Democratic Party held the Republican Party responsible for the Long Depression. The Republicans were divided on the currency issue. Grant, who with hard money North Eastern Republicans, vetoed an inflation bill. Grant was blamed for the nation's problems, while he was accused of wanting a third term.  Grant never officially campaigned, but traveled West, to emphasize his relatively popular Indian policy.

The October elections swept the Republicans from office, and was a repudation of Grant's veto. In Indiana and Ohio, the Republicans suffered losses, caused by the money issue and the temperance movement. The Democratic Party won the New York governorship for Samuel Tilden. The Democrats won the U.S. House, gaining 182 seats, while the Republicans retained 103 seats. The Republicans retained control of the Senate, but the new class included 14 Democrats and 11 Republicans. The Democratic Party also had strong victories in New Jersey, Massachusetts, Pennsylvania, Missouri, and Illinois.

In the South, the 1874 election campaign was violent. Six Republican office holders were murdered in Coushatta, Louisiana. On September 14, General Longstreet, police, and black militia fought 3,500 White Leaguers who attempted to capture the statehouse in New Orleans, that ended with 32 people killed.  Grant issued a dispersal proclamation, the next day, and sent 5,000 troops and 5 gunboats to New Orleans. The White League resistance collapsed. The North disapproved of Grant's federal intervention into the election. Republican representation dropped by 60 percent. Racism in both the North and South caused the rejection of Reconstruction. In his December 1874 annual message to Congress, Grant condemned violence against blacks in the South.

Reforms and scandals

Scandals and frauds continued to be exposed during Grant's second term in office, although Grant's appointments of reformers to his cabinet temporarily helped his presidential reputation, cleaned up federal departments, and defeated the notorious Whiskey Ring. Grant, however, often remained loyal to cabinet members or appointees involved in corruption or mismanagement, refusing to believe in their guilt. The Democrats along with the Liberal Republicans had gained control of the House of Representatives and held many Committee meetings to stop political graft. The Emma Silver mine was a minor embarrassment associated with American Ambassador to Britain, Robert C. Schenck, using his name to promote a worked out silver mine. The Crédit Mobilier scandal's origins were during the presidential Administrations of Abraham Lincoln and Andrew Johnson; however, political congressional infighting during the Grant Administration exposed the scandal.

Sanborn contracts

In June 1874, Treasury Secretary William A. Richardson gave private contracts to one John D. Sanborn who in turn collected illegally withheld taxes for fees at inflated commissions. The profits from the commissions were allegedly split with Richardson and Senator Benjamin Butler, while Sanborn claimed these payments were "expenses". Senator Butler had written a loophole in the law that allowed Sanborn to collect the commissions, but Sanborn would not reveal whom he split the profits with.

Pratt & Boyd
In April 1875, it was discovered that Attorney General George H. Williams allegedly received a bribe through a $30,000 gift to his wife from a Merchant house company, Pratt & Boyd, to drop the case for fraudulent customhouse entries. Williams was forced to resign by Grant in 1875.

Delano's Department of Interior 
By 1875, the Department of the Interior under Secretary of Interior Columbus Delano was in serious disrepair with corruption and fraud. Profiteering prevailed in the Bureau of Indian Affairs, controlled by corrupt clerks and bogus agents. This proved to be the most serious detriment to Grant's Indian peace policy. Many agents that worked for the department made unscrupulous fortunes and retired with more money than their pay would allow at the expense and exploitation of Native Americans. Delano had allowed "Indian Attorneys" who were paid by Native American tribes $8.00 a day plus food and travel expenses for sham representation in Washington. Delano exempted his department from Grant's civil service reform implementation in federal offices. Delano told Grant the Interior Department was too large to implement civil service reform.

Delano's son, John Delano, and Ulysses S. Grant's own brother, Orvil Grant, were discovered to have been awarded lucrative corrupt cartographical contracts by Surveyor General Silas Reed. Neither John Delano nor Orvil Grant performed any work or were qualified to hold such surveying positions. Massive fraud was also found in the Patent Office with corrupt clerks who embezzled from the government payroll. Under increasing pressure by the press and Indian reformers, Delano resigned from office on October 15, 1875. Grant then appointed Zachariah Chandler as Secretary of the Interior who replaced Delano. Chandler vigorously uncovered and cleaned up the fraud in the department by firing all the clerks and banned the phony "Indian Attorneys" access to Washington. Grant's "Quaker" or church appointments partially made up the lack of food staples and housing from the government. Chandler cleaned up the Patent Office by firing all the corrupt clerks.

Whiskey Ring prosecuted

Although Grant's presidency is often criticized for scandals, historians have over looked Grant's appointments of reformers. In May 1875, Secretary of Treasury Benjamin H. Bristow discovered that millions of dollars of taxes were being funneled into an illegal ring from whiskey manufacturers. Prosecutions ensued, and many were put in prison. Grant's private Secretary Orville E. Babcock was indicted and later acquitted in trial. Grant's new Attorney General Edwards Pierrepont and Bristow formed an anti-corruption team to weed out criminal activity during Grant's second term. The Whiskey Ring was organized throughout the United States, and by 1875 it was a fully operating criminal association. The investigation and closure of the Whiskey Ring resulted in 230 indictments, 110 convictions, and $3,000,000 in tax revenues that were returned to the Treasury Department. Bristow and Pierrpont brought evidence to Grant of Babcock's involvement. Grant asked Babcock with Bristow and Pierrepont in attendance at the White House about the evidence. Babcock gave Grant an explanation that the evidence did not concern the Ring, and Grant quietly accepted Babcock's words at face value. During the prosecution of the Whiskey Ring leaders, Grant testified on behalf of his friend Babcock. As a result, Babcock was acquitted. However, the deposition by Grant was a great embarrassment to his reputation. The Babcock trial turned into an impeachment trial against the President by Grant's political opponents.

Trading post ring

In March 1876 it was discovered under House investigations that Secretary of War William W. Belknap was taking extortion money in exchange for allowing an Indian trading post agent to remain in position at Fort Sill. Belknap was allowed to resign by Grant and as a result, was acquitted in a Senate impeachment trial. Profits were made at the expense of Native Americans who were supposed to receive food and clothing from the government. In late April 1876, Grant lashed out at Lieut. Col. George A. Custer, after Custer had testified at a Congressional committee one month before against Grant's brother Orville and Sec. Belknap. There had been rumors Custer had talked with the press concerning the Indian post profiteering. Custer personally went to the White House to clear matters up with the President. However, Grant refused to see him three times. When Custer left Washington on May 3 to return to Fort Lincoln, he had been removed from overall command by Grant and denied any participation of the Sioux Campaign; having been replaced by Brig. Gen. Alfred Terry. However, at Terry's insistence, Grant relented and allowed Custer to participate in the campaign against the Sioux on the condition he did not take any pressmen.

Cattellism
In March 1876, Secretary of Navy George M. Robeson was charged by a Democratic-controlled House investigation committee with giving lucrative contracts to Alexander Cattell & Company, a grain supplier, in return for real estate, loans, and payment of debts. The House investigating committee also discovered that Secretary Robeson had allegedly embezzled $15 million in naval construction appropriations. Since there were no financial paper trails or enough evidence for impeachment and conviction, the House Investigation committee admonished Robeson and claimed he had set up a corrupt contracting system known as "Cattellism".

Safe burglary conspiracy
In September 1876, Orville E. Babcock, Superintendent of Public Works and Buildings, was indicted in a safe burglary conspiracy case and trial. In April, corrupt building contractors in Washington, D.C. were on trial for graft when a safe robbery occurred. Bogus secret service agents broke into a safe and attempted to frame Columbus Alexander, who had exposed the corrupt contracting ring. Babcock was named as part of the conspiracy, but later acquitted in the trial against the burglars. Evidence suggests that Backcock was involved with the swindles by the corrupt Washington Contractors Ring and he wanted revenge on Columbus Alexander, an avid reformer and critic of the Grant Administration. There was also evidence that safe burglary jury had been tampered with.

Election of 1876
In the presidential election of 1876, the Republicans nominated the fiscally conservative Rutherford B. Hayes and the Democrats nominated reformer Samuel Tilden. Results were split. Tilden received 51% of the popular vote; Hayes 48%; many black Republicans were not allowed to vote, however. Twenty key electoral votes remained undecided and in dispute. Both Republicans and Democrats claimed victory and the threat of a second civil war was eminent. Grant was watchful; encouraged Congress to settle the election by commission; and determined to keep a peaceful transfer of power. On January 29, 1877, Grant signed the Electoral Commission Act that gave a 15-member bipartisan commission power to determine electoral votes. The commission gave Hayes 185 electoral votes; Tilden received 184. Grant's personal honesty, firmness, and even-handedness reassured the nation and a second civil war was averted.

Historical evaluations

Grant's presidency has traditionally been viewed by historians as incompetent and full of corruption. An examination of his presidency reveals Grant had both successes and failures during his two terms in office. In recent years historians have elevated his presidential rating because of his support for African American civil rights. Grant had urged the passing of the 15th Amendment and signed into law the Civil Rights Bill of 1875 that gave all citizens access to places of public enterprise. He leaned heavily toward the Radical camp and often sided with their Reconstruction policies, signing into law Force Acts to prosecute the Ku Klux Klan. In foreign policy Grant won praise for the Treaty of Washington, settling the Alabama Claims issue with Britain through arbitration. Economically he sided with Eastern bankers and signed the Public Credit Act that paid U.S. debts in gold specie, but was blamed for the severe economic depression that lasted 1873–1877. Grant, wary of powerful congressional leaders, was the first president to ask for a line item veto – though Congress never allowed one.

His presidency was inundated with many scandals caused by low standards and carelessness with his political appointees and personal associates. Nepotism, practiced by Grant, was unrestrained with almost forty family members or relatives who financially benefited from government appointments or employment. His associations with these scandals have tarnished his personal reputation while president and afterward. Despite the scandals, by the end of Grant's second term the corruption in the Departments of Interior (1875), Treasury (1874), and Justice (1875) were cleaned up by his new cabinet members.

Grant's generous treatment of Robert E. Lee at Appomattox helped give him popularity in the South. Although he kept civil rights on the political agenda, the Republican party at the end of Grant's second term shifted to pursuing conservative fiscal policies. His weak response to the Panic of 1873 hurt the economy and seriously damaged his party, which lost heavily in 1874. Grant's financial policies favored Wall Street, but his term ended with the nation mired in a deep economic depression that Grant could not comprehend or deal with. Revisionist historians during the first half of the twentieth century have tended to prop up a romantic view of the Confederacy and the Lost Cause at the expense of downgrading the Union cause and Grant's presidency as a corrupt despot.
The 20th-century historical views of Grant were less favorable. Political analyst Michael Barone noted in 1998 that, "Ulysses S. Grant is universally ranked among the greatest American generals, and his Memoirs are widely considered to belong with the best military autobiographies ever written. But he is inevitably named, by conservatives as well as liberals, as one of the worst presidents in American history." Barone argues that: "This consensus, however, is being challenged by writers outside the professional historians' guild." Barone points to a lawyer Frank Scaturro, who led the movement to restore Grant's Tomb while only a college student, and in 1998 wrote the first book of the modern era which portrays Grant's presidency in a positive light. Barone said that Scaturro's work was a "convincing case that Grant was a strong and, in many important respects, successful president. It is an argument full of significance for how we see the course of American political history ... Scaturro's work ... should prompt a reassessment of the entire Progressive-New Deal Tradition."

In the 21st Century, Grant's reputation and ranking had significantly increased, that followed a series of positive biographies written by noted historians, that included Jean Edward Smith, Grant, H.W. Brands, The Man Who Saved the Union: Ulysses Grant in War and Peace and most recently Ronald C. White, American Ulysses: A Life of Ulysses S. Grant. Historian Joan Waugh said Grant took steps where a few other presidents attempted "in the areas of Native American policy, civil service reform, and African American rights." Waugh said Grant "executed a successful foreign policy and was responsible for improving Anglo-American relations." Interest in his presidency has also increased by historians, that included Josiah H Bunting III, Ulysses S. Grant: The American Presidents Series: The 18th President.

Administration and cabinet

Judicial appointments

Grant appointed four Justices to the Supreme Court of the United States during his presidency. When Grant took office, there were eight seats on the bench. Congress had passed a Judicial Circuits Act in 1866, which provided for the elimination of one seat on the Court each time a justice retired, to prevent Andrew Johnson from nominating replacements for them. In April 1869 Congress passed a Judiciary Act which fixed the size of the Supreme Court at nine.

Grant had the opportunity to fill two Supreme Court seats in 1869. His initial nominees were:
 Ebenezer R. Hoar, nominated December 14, 1869, rejected by the Senate (Vote: 24–33) on February 3, 1870.
 Edwin M. Stanton, nominated December 20, 1869, confirmed by the Senate (vote: 46–11) on December 20, 1869, died before he took office.
He subsequently submitted two more nominees:
 William Strong, nominated February 7, 1870, confirmed by the Senate on February 18, 1870.
 Joseph P. Bradley, nominated February 7, 1870, confirmed by the Senate (vote: 46–9) on March 21, 1870.
Both men were railroad lawyers, and their appointment led to accusations that Grant intended them to overturn the case of Hepburn v. Griswold, which had been decided the same day they were nominated. That case, which was unpopular with business interests, held that the federal debt incurred before 1862 must be paid in gold, not greenbacks. Nonetheless, both Strong and Bradley were confirmed, and the following year Hepburn was indeed reversed.

Grant had the opportunity to fill two more seats during his second term. To fill the first vacancy he nominated:
 Ward Hunt, nominated December 3, 1872, confirmed by the Senate on December 11, 1872.
In May 1873, Chief Justice Salmon P. Chase died suddenly. Grant initially offered the seat to Senator Roscoe Conkling, who declined, as did Senator Timothy Howe. Grant made three attempts to fill vacancies:
 George Henry Williams, nominated December 1, 1873, withdrawn on January 8, 1874. The Senate had a dim view of Williams's performance at the Justice Department and refused to act on the nomination.
 Caleb Cushing, nominated January 9, 1874, withdrawn on January 13, 1874. Cushing was an eminent lawyer and respected in his field, but the emergence of his wartime correspondence with Jefferson Davis doomed his nomination.
 Morrison Waite, nominated January 19, 1874, confirmed by the Senate (vote: 63–0) on January 21, 1874. Waite was an uncontroversial nominee, but in his time on the Court he authored two of the decisions (United States v. Reese and United States v. Cruikshank) that did the most to undermine Reconstruction-era laws for the protection of black Americans.

States admitted to the Union
 Colorado – August 1, 1876

Vetoes
Grant vetoed more bills than any of his predecessors with 93 vetoes during the 41st through 44th Congresses. 45 were regular vetoes, and 48 of them were pocket vetoes. Grant had 4 vetoes overridden by Congress.

Government agencies instituted
 Department of Justice (1870)
 Office of the Solicitor General (1870)
 United States Civil Service Commission (1871); Congressional appropriations expired in 1873, however, the commission continued to function. The Pendleton Civil Service Reform Act in 1883 renewed appropriations and enhanced the federal power and scope of the commission. Grant's U.S. Attorney General Amos T. Akerman ruled that the Civil Service Commission was Constitutional as long as the purpose was to increase government's power to higher qualified workers and improve the efficiency of running the government. Akerman stated that the Civil Service Commission did not have the Constitutional power to stop or prevent appointments.
 Office of the Surgeon General (1871)
 Army Weather Bureau (currently known as the National Weather Service) (1870)

Notes

References

Bibliography

By author
 
 
 
 
 
 
 
 
 
  Chamberlain reviewed speech by Charles Francis Adams to New York Historical Society on November 19, 1901.
 ;   online review
 
 
 
 
 
 
 
 
 
 
 
 
 
 
 
 
 
 
 
 
 
 
 
 , Pulitzer prize, but hostile to Grant
 
 
 
 
 
 
 
 
 
 
 
 
 
 
 
 
 
 
 
 
 
 Simpson,  Brooks D. The Reconstruction Presidents (1998) pp. 133–196 on Grant.

By title (anonymous)

Newspaper articles

Further reading
 
 Buenker, John D. and Joseph Buenker, eds. Encyclopedia of the Gilded Age and Progressive Era (2005). 1256 pp. in three volumes. 900 essays by 200 scholars
 Donald, David Herbert. Charles Sumner and the Rights of Man (1970), Pulitzer Prize–winning biography of Grant's enemy in the Senate
 Fitzgerald, Michael W. Splendid Failure: Postwar Reconstruction in the American South. (2007) 234 pp. 
 Foner, Eric. Reconstruction: America's Unfinished Revolution, 1863–1877 (1988),  Pulitzer Prize–winning synthesis from neoabolitionist perspective
 Graber, Jennifer. If a War It May Be Called' The Peace Policy with American Indians." Religion and American Culture: A Journal of Interpretation (2014) 24#1 pp: 36–69.
 
 
 McCullough, Stephen. "Avoiding war: the foreign Policy of Ulysses S. Grant and Hamilton Fish." in Edward O. Frantz, ed.,  A Companion to the Reconstruction Presidents 1865–1881 (2014): 311+
 , major scholarly biography
 
 Mantell, Martin E. Johnson, Grant, and the Politics of Reconstruction (1973) online edition
 
 
 
 Perret, Geoffrey. Ulysses S. Grant: Soldier & President (2009). popular biography
 Priest, Andrew. "Thinking about Empire: The Administration of Ulysses S. Grant, Spanish Colonialism and the Ten Years' War in Cuba." Journal of American Studies (2014) 48#2 pp: 541–558.
 
 Rahill, Peter J. The Catholic Indian Missions and Grant's Peace Policy 1870–1884 (1953) online
 Simpson, Brooks D. The Reconstruction Presidents (1998)
 
 Tatum, Lawrie. Our Red Brothers and the Peace Policy of President Ulysses S. Grant (2010)
 Thompson, Margaret S. The "Spider Web": Congress and Lobbying in the Age of Grant (1985)
 Trefousse, Hans L. Historical Dictionary of Reconstruction Greenwood (1991), 250 entries
 
 
 Williams, Frank J. "Grant and Heroic Leadership." in Edward O. Frantz, ed.,  A Companion to the Reconstruction Presidents 1865–1881 (2014): 343–352.
 Woodward, C. Vann. ed. Responses of the Presidents to Charges of Misconduct (1974), essays by historians on each administration from George Washington to Lyndon Johnson.
 Woodward, C. Vann. Reunion and Reaction (1950) on bargain of 1877

Primary sources
 
 Simon, John Y., ed., The Papers of Ulysses S. Grant, Southern Illinois University Press (1967–2009 ) complete in 31 volumes
 Online version vol 1–31; vol 19–28 (1994–2005) cover the presidential years; includes all known letters and writing by Grant, and the most important letters written to him.
 Richardson, James, ed. Compilation of the Messages and Papers of the Presidents (numerous editions, 1901–20), vol 7 contains most of Grant's official presidential public documents and messages to Congress
 1869 State of the Union Message – Ulysses S. Grant
 1870 State of the Union Message – Ulysses S. Grant
 1871 State of the Union Message – Ulysses S. Grant
 1872 State of the Union Message – Ulysses S. Grant
 1873 State of the Union Message – Ulysses S. Grant
 1874 State of the Union Message – Ulysses S. Grant
 1875 State of the Union Message – Ulysses S. Grant
 1876 State of the Union Message – Ulysses S. Grant
 1869 Inaugural Address – Ulysses S. Grant
 1873 Inaugural Address – Ulysses S. Grant

Yearbooks
 American Annual Cyclopedia...1868 (1869), online, highly detailed compendium of facts and primary sources
 American Annual Cyclopedia...for 1869 (1870), large compendium of facts, thorough national coverage; includes also many primary documents online edition
 Appleton's Annual Cyclopedia...for 1870 (1871)
 American Annual Cyclopedia...for 1872 (1873)
 Appleton's Annual Cyclopedia...for 1873 (1879)
 Appleton's Annual Cyclopedia...for 1875 (1877)
 Appleton's Annual Cyclopedia ...for 1876 (1885)
 Appleton's Annual Cyclopedia...for 1877 (1878)

External links
 
 
 
 Extensive essay on Ulysses S. Grant and shorter essays on each member of his cabinet from the Miller Center of Public Affairs, U. of Virginia

 
1860s in the United States
1870s in the United States
Presidency
1869 establishments in the United States
1877 disestablishments in the United States
Grant, Ulysses S.